The University of Michigan School of Information (UMSI or iSchool) is the informatics and information science school of the University of Michigan, a public research university in Ann Arbor, Michigan. It offers baccalaureate, magisterial, and doctoral degrees.

The School of Information is part of a growing list of i-schools devoted to the study of information as a discipline. These institutions have varied histories, some being newly created, others developing from earlier schools or departments focused on library and information science (as with SI), computer science, communications, or information technology. SI was the first of these institutions to relabel itself as a "school of information." It is currently housed in the North Quadrangle on the University of Michigan's Ann Arbor campus.

History
Before 1992, the School of Information was the School of Information and Library Studies. In 1992, the president of the University of Michigan, James Duderstadt appointed Daniel E. Atkins III as the dean of the school. Under the direction of Dr. Atkins and with support from Duderstadt and W.K. Kellogg Foundation, the school became the School of Information with the intent to reach beyond traditional library science arena. The School of Information was officially established in 1996 offering a master's of science in information with some specializations (library and information science, archives and record management, human computer interaction, information economics management and policy, and a tailored program).

Academics

Undergraduate degree
Since 2008, the University of Michigan has offered a bachelor's degree in Informatics. Informatics is housed in the College of Literature, Science, and the Arts in cooperation with the College of Engineering and the School of Information and gives students a solid grounding in information systems, statistics, mathematics and computer programming. Depending on the track chosen, students are prepared for many career paths, including business, research, government, computer programming, education and non-profit organizations.

In 2014, the School of Information began to offer an undergraduate degree, a Bachelor of Science in Information (BSI). This interdisciplinary degree focuses on the social/behavioral and technological sciences. High school students may apply to this program "preferred admission" when applying to The University of Michigan, or students already enrolled at the university may apply to transfer into the program beginning in their Junior year.

Master's degrees
The Master of Science in Information (MSI) degree is a 48-credit hour professional degree built on a core curriculum of "foundations" courses that synthesize content and methodology from library and information science, computer science, the humanities, and the social sciences. Real-world engagement is a hallmark of the master's program: all students are required to complete internships or mentorships in the field. The program is highly interdisciplinary, featuring faculty and students from a wide range of academic fields.

In 2012, the School of Information and the School of Public Health began offering a new join graduate program in Health Informatics.

As of 2019, the School of Information offers a 34-credit, 100% online Master of Applied Data Science (MADS) degree. The  degree was developed in collaboration with the U-M Office of Academic Innovation to meet the growing demand for people with experience in applied data science. It is first online degree offered by the School of Information and one of the first offered by the university.

Doctoral degree
The school's doctoral program is a full-time course of study, typically four years post-baccalaureate, leading to the Doctor of Information (Ph.D.). The program is designed to enable students to engage in advanced study and research in a various information fields such as the economics of information, human-computer interaction, library and information services, organizational issues, archives and records management, new systems architecture, digital libraries, information systems management, and digital documents/digital publishing.

Faculty and research
Faculty at the school are drawn from an unusually wide range of academic backgrounds including linguistics, public policy, computer science, library and information science, management, law, business, economics, psychology, history, and communications.

The school's faculty and students are active in research, pursuing projects in various areas and methods. Their stated goal is to develop an integrated understanding of human needs in relation to information systems and social structures, searching for unifying principles that illuminate the role of information in computation, cognition, communication, and community.

The school's infrastructure includes a range of research facilities and equipment. Researchers also have access to a number of off-campus research sites. Projects are often collaborations with researchers from other units at the university.

References

External links
 Official website

Information, University of Michigan School of
Information schools
Educational institutions established in 1969
1969 establishments in Michigan
University of Michigan campus